Modedit was a MOD file editor (a form of Tracker) for MS-DOS written by Norman Lin and distributed as Shareware in 1991 and 1992. It was one of the first MOD software available for the PC. Its ability to play MODs through the PC speaker without requiring additional sound hardware, was achieved by using code written by Mark J. Cox.

Releases
The most popular version was the initial release, v2.00, in 1991 (v1.0 was a private release).  Its screen was divided into three parts: Pattern editor, Pattern sequence table, and Sample list.  Navigation around these parts was by keyboard.

Version 3.01 (released late 1992) added a piano roll display and mouse support, but it was less popular. It shipped with a MOD file of The House of the Rising Sun as a demonstration.

Editor
The pattern editor showed details of the current pattern in the sequence table. It had 4 columns corresponding to the 4 channels of the MOD file, and each column was divided into 3 smaller columns for pitch (note name and octave number), sample number (corresponding to an entry in the sample list), and special effects code (if any). These values could be edited directly by typing, in a manner reminiscent of a hex editor.

References

Notes
 Review from the "Soundblaster Book" http://awe.com/mark/dev/play_sb2.jpg
 ModEdit v3.01 listing
 Screenshot of ModEdit 2.00
 ModEdit v1.0 Screenshot gallery
 
 Testware Ltd's Shareware catalogue, 1993 edition

DOS software
Shareware
1991 software
Audio trackers